The 2021 Football West season was the eighth season since the establishment of the National Premier Leagues in Western Australia.

Pre-season changes
Due to the disruptions to the 2020 season due to the COVID-19 pandemic in Australia, there was no promotion and relegation at the end of the 2020 season.

League Tables

2021 National Premier Leagues WA
The competition was a double round-robin played over 22 rounds, followed by an end of season Top 4 Cup competition. The NPL Premier normally qualifies for the national NPL finals series, but the 2021 National Premier Leagues finals series was cancelled.

Top Four Cup

2021 WA State League 1
The 2021 WA State League 1 season was a double round-robin played over 22 rounds, followed by an end of season Top 4 Cup competition.

Finals

Inter-divisional promotion/relegation play-offs

2021 WA State League 2
The 2021 WA State League 2 season was a double round-robin played over 22 rounds, followed by a promotion/relegation competition.

2021 NPL Women

The 2021 NPL WA Women was the second season in the National Premier Leagues WA Women format. It was played over 21 rounds as a triple round-robin, followed by an end of season Top 4 Cup competition.

Finals

2021 Men's State Cup

Western Australian soccer clubs competed in the Football West State Cup competition (known as the Belt Up State Cup for sponsorship reasons), initially involving teams from various divisions of the Amateur League and Metropolitan League competitions, and from regional teams from the Goldfields, South West and Great Southern regions. In later rounds, teams from the two divisions of the State League and the National Premier Leagues WA entered.

This knockout competition was won by Floreat Athena, their 8th title.

The competition also served as the Western Australian Preliminary rounds for the 2021 FFA Cup. The two finalists – ECU Joondalup and Floreat Athena – qualified for the final rounds, entering at the Round of 32.

2021 Women's State Cup
Western Australian soccer clubs competed in the Football West Women's State Cup competition, which involved teams from both the NPLW WA and State League Women's competitions.

This knockout competition was won by Murdoch University Melville, their 1st title.

References

External links
Football West Official website

Soccer in Western Australia
Football West
2021